Hornsey railway station is in Hornsey in the London Borough of Haringey, north London.

It is in Travelcard Zone 3. The station is managed by Great Northern on behalf of Network Rail, and is adjacent to the Hornsey train maintenance depot. It was built in 1850 on the Great Northern Railway.

History

The GN&SR stations on each side would have been the same as the main line stations. The GN&SR route and stations north of Finsbury Park were cancelled in 1902 when the GN&SR was taken over by Charles Yerkes' consortium which planned to merge it with the Brompton and Piccadilly Circus Railway to form the Great Northern, Piccadilly and Brompton Railway from Finsbury Park to Hammersmith (now part of the London Underground's Piccadilly line).

Service
All services at Hornsey are operated by Great Northern using  EMUs.

The typical off-peak service in trains per hour is:
 4 tph to 
 2 tph to  via 
 2 tph to 

During the peak hours, the station is served by an additional half-hourly service between Moorgate and Hertford North, and the service between Moorgate and Welwyn Garden City is increased to 4 tph.

Connections
 Turnpike Lane London Underground station is a 15-minute walk away.
London Buses route 41 and night routes N41 and N91 serve the station.

References

External links
 The Metamorphosis of Hornsey Station on Harringay Online

Railway stations in the London Borough of Haringey
Former Great Northern Railway stations
Railway stations in Great Britain opened in 1850
Railway stations served by Govia Thameslink Railway
Proposed London Underground stations
Unbuilt Great Northern, Piccadilly and Brompton Railway stations
Railway station